Gao Gong (19 January 1513 – 4 August 1578) courtesy name Suqing, art name Zhongxuan, was a Chinese politician of the Ming dynasty.

Gao was born in Xinzheng, Henan. He became jinshi in 1541, then held a post at Hanlin Academy. Since 1552, he served as tutor to the then heir apparent, later the Longqing Emperor for nine years, which made the emperor trust him fully. He served successively as Vice Minister of Rites, Vice Minister of Personnel, and Minister of Rites. In 1566, he was promoted to the Grand Secretariat of Wenyuan Chamber with recommendation from Xu Jie. After the enthronement of the Longqing Emperor, Gao's higher status catalyzed a sudden escalation of antagonism between Gao and Xu. Impeached by several censors, he was forced to retire in 1567. Zhang Juzheng did his utmost to persuade the emperor to recall Gao for political reasons. Thus, Gao returned to Beijing in 1569. He replaced Li Chunfang, the former Senior Grand Secretary, who was defeated in the political struggle by the death of the emperor. Zhang was hostile to him afterwards. The eunuchs in the Directorate of Ceremonial headed by Feng Bao brooked no weakening of their power by Gao. Hence, an alignment grew up between Zhang and Feng aimed at marginalizing Gao. They criticized Gao before Empress Dowager Xiaoding. Gao had to retire and return home once again. He finished the memoir Bingta yiyan [The last words left on my sickbed] in his later years. In 1578, Gao died at home.

Although Gao's term was quite brief, he made great efforts with Zhang to subsume Altan Khan's Tumed into the tributary system. Consequently, he was granted the Grand Preceptor as the posthumous title in 1602.

Notes

References 

 
 

1512 births
1578 deaths
Politicians from Zhengzhou
Senior Grand Secretaries of the Ming dynasty